The BB 63000 is a diesel-powered centre cab freight shunting locomotive used by French rail operator SNCF. First introduced in 1953, various batches, with increasingly more powerful engines, were built up till 1964. Along with its successors, classes BB 63400 and BB 63500, together totalling over 800 locomotives, it could be found all over France.

Construction
The first batch of 72 locomotives, numbered BB 63001–BB 63072, were powered by Sulzer 6LDA22B engines developing .

Exports
Further examples were operated in Spain as RENFE Class 307, in Portugal as Class 1200, in Luxembourg as Classes 850/900 and in the former Yugoslavia as Yugoslav Railways Class 642/643. The latter are now operated by Croatian Railways as Classes 2401 and 2402.

Preservation
Two examples of the class have been preserved at the Chemin de Fer à vapeur des Trois Vallées at Mariembourg, BB 63123 and BB 63149.

References

Railway locomotives introduced in 1953
63000
Bo′Bo′ locomotives
Standard gauge locomotives of France
BB 63000

Shunting locomotives